Lim Dong-hyun (born June 1, 1994) is a South Korean football player.

Playing career
Lim Dong-hyun played for J2 League club; Gainare Tottori in 2013 season.

Club statistics

References

External links

1994 births
Living people
South Korean footballers
J2 League players
Gainare Tottori players
Association football defenders